Ixias is a genus of pierid butterflies ranging from the Arabian Peninsula to the Philippines, mostly in the Indomalayan realm.

Species
Ixias flavipennis Grose-Smith, 1885
Ixias kuehni Röber, 1891
Ixias malumsinicum Thieme, 1897
Ixias marianne (Cramer, 1779)
Ixias paluensis Martin, 1914
Ixias piepersii (Snellen, 1877)
Ixias pyrene (Linnaeus, 1764)
Ixias reinwardtii (van Vollenhoven, 1860)
Ixias venilia (Godart, 1819)
Ixias vollenhovii (Wallace, 1867)
Ixias weelei (van Eecke, 1912)

References

External links
Funet
Images representing Ixias at EOL

Teracolini
Pieridae genera
Taxa named by Jacob Hübner